The Barra War, also known as the Anglo-Niumi War or the British-Barra War, was a military conflict which lasted from 1831 to 1832 between forces of the British Empire and the Kingdom of Niumi, in what is now The Gambia.

Background 
There were growing British-Niumi tensions for over a decade before the war broke out in 1831. The Niumi people were determined to preserve their position in trading arrangements and to maintain their kingdom's integrity. The British desired to become the prominent trading power in the Gambia River, rather than the French. In 1824, the French were said to be in control of more than half of the trade in the river. By 1829, there were reports that British merchants were sustaining a "very heavy loss" in trade in the face of competition from foreign powers.

During the 1820s, the British renewed interest in inland settlements and trading posts to cut off French trade competition. In 1823, Alexander Grant founded a settlement on MacCarthy Island further up the river. However, the French were still able to trade as they claimed a privilege to access their settlement at Albreda, in the Kingdom of Niumi, without interference from the British. By the middle of the 1820s, Franco-British rivalry in the river was "very acute."

After settling on Bathurst in 1816, Grant had told the King of Niumi, Kollimanka Mane, that the British had no intention of "depriving him or his people of any of their rights and privileges." Despite this it became clear within days of his arrival that Grant would not honour local customs to the extent they wished, with him refusing to pay 148 dollars for a small slave schooner that had passed Barra Point. After that point, Grant refused to pay duties for the slave ships that he captured. Other subsequent events led the people of Niumi to believe, after his death in 1823 and succession by Burungai Sonko, that he had been far too weak in his dealings with the British.

In 1826, the British forced Burungai to cede a mile's breadth of land on the north bank of the river, known as the Ceded Mile. The British founded a fort, Fort Bullen, in the Ceded Mile. British merchants and officials also expanded elsewhere on the river, and in 1831 the British sought to use Niumi's Dog Island as a settlement. Some tribes objected, so Rendall suspended the monthly payment to Niumi for the possession of the Ceded Mile. After British settlers made it to Dog Island, they were threatened by the people of Niumi.

Conflict
The determination of the people of Niumi to remove British encroachments on their territory led the British to dispatch a force to better hold Fort Bullen on Barra Point. Ensign Fearon of the Royal African Colonial Corps, accompanied by 22 soldiers, 50 discharged soldiers, and a quickly-formed militia, set out on 22 August 1831. They were dispatched to Essau to "ascertain the cause of alarm," but their presence aggravated and increased tensions so that fighting broke out. Fearon was forced to withdraw to Fort Bullen. The Barra soldiers advanced on the fort, completely surrounding it from the land side. The next day, Fearon having lost 23 of his soldiers, evacuated the fort and retired to Bathurst, across the river. Following Fearon's defeat, neighbouring chiefs sent large contingents of men to reinforce the King of Barra's soldiers. Several thousand armed natives were collected only  from Bathurst, and with the settlement in such imminent danger, the Lieutenant Governor sent an urgent dispatch to Sierra Leone for assistance.

The dispatch arrived on 1 October, and on 4 October a force under Captain Stewart of the 1st West India Regiment was dispatched. The force consisted of detachments from the 1st and 2nd West India Regiments, from the Sierra Leone Militia, and from the Royal African Corps. They sailed for The Gambia in HMS Plumper, a brig, and the Parmilia transport. On 9 November they arrived in The Gambia and found Fort Bullen still in the hands of the natives. Fortunately, they had confined themselves to making demonstrations rather than taking Bathurst, which lay entirely at their mercy. On 11 November, Stewart's force landed at Barra Point, consisting of 451 of all ranks. They were supported with heavy cover fire from the Plumper (under Lieutenant Cresey), the Parmilia, and an armed colonial schooner. The Mandinkas were estimated at 2500-3000 strong and were skillfully covered from the gunfire by their entrenchments and by the shelter of the high grass. They sustained heavy fire upon Stewart's force who were landing directly in their front. Despite this, the British pushed on, and after an hour's hard fighting, during which the Mandinkas contested every inch of ground, they succeeded in driving them from their entrenchments at bayonet point and pursued them for some distance through the bush. The British lost two men in this action, with three officers and 47 other ranks wounded. Over the next few days, the British focused on landing the guns and placing Fort Bullen in a state of defense. At daybreak on 17 November, the British marched to attack Essau, leaving Fort Bullen in charge of the crew of the Plumper.

On approaching the town, the British deployed into line, and the guns from the Plumper opened fire on the stockade. This was kept up for five hours, and the fire was returned just as vigorously from the town with small arms and artillery. The British fired rockets into the town, the first of which set fire to a house, but the rest had little impact due to precautions taken by the King of Barra's troops. At noon, some of them left the rear of the town, and shortly afterwards a very large force of Mandinkas appeared on the British right flank. A second force was also spotted making a detour around to their left flank, apparently with the intention of attacking their rear. The British ammunition running low, and the artillery having made little impact on the stockade, the British decided to retreat to Benty Point. They had suffered a loss of 11 killed and 59 wounded. Lieutenant Leigh of the Sierra Leone Militia, and five other men later died of their wounds.

On 7 December, Lieutenant Colonel Hingston of the Royal African Corps arrived with reinforcements and assumed command of the British forces. Upon realizing the increase in British strength, the King of Barra notified them of his desires to open negotiations. Terms being proposed which he accepted, a treaty was drawn up and signed at Fort Bullen on 4 January 1832, ending the war.

Aftermath 
The British Forces were somewhat successful in restricting American trade, and the Royal Navy's impressment of the American commoners was also an arguable success. But, the Americans were quick to reverse this damage by proportionately increasing trade with other accessible entities.

See also

 Military history of The Gambia

References 

Wars involving the states and peoples of Africa
Wars involving the United Kingdom
History of the Gambia
19th-century military history of the United Kingdom
19th century in Africa
Military history of the Gambia
African resistance to colonialism
Kingdom of Niumi